Kotelniki is a rural locality (a village) in Karagaysky District of Perm Krai, Russia.

References

Rural localities in Karagaysky District